Halba are a tribal community found in Chhattisgarh, Maharashtra, Madhya Pradesh and Orissa in India. They speak the Halbi language. They are primarily agricultural community.

Etymology
The name Halba derive form the term 'Hal' that locally means ploughing. Halba are primarily agricultural community.

History
The Halba tribal community are the chief tribe of Bastar region of Chhattisgarh. They adopted farming. Many are weaver known as Koshti. They were employed in militia under various ruling dynasty of the region. According to Robert Vane Russell, Halba are mixed caste of Gond and Hindu. Probably descendants of servants of Odia kings who formed some militia to maintain authority. But according to recent genetics, they are not related to Gond.

After the Chalukya, the region came under Maratha and British East India Company rule. Halba rebellion was led by governor of Dongar Ajmer Singh against Maratha and British in 1774. He wanted to establish an independent state. But Maratha and British defeated the Halba forces and massacre many Halba tribal.

Society
The Halba have four subgroups: Pitnia Halba, Bunkar Halba, Telia Halba and Jadi/Jadia Halba. Pintia are those who have migrated to Odisha. Bunkar are those who adopted weaving for their livelihood, Telia Halba who reside in Chhattisgarh. Weaver Halba are also known as Koshti. The population of Halba is around 0.75 million. 

They have many surnames including Som,Naik, Raut, Voyar, Nadge, Kothwar, Gharait, Chudi, Pakhle, Gawad, Hedu, Medke, Yele, Mankar, Chillar, Sherkar, Margai, Chandrapur, Bhandara, Bhandari etc.

Culture

Language
Halba speak Halbi language which is mixed language of Marathi and Odia language.

Cuisine
Although Halba are primarily agricultural community. Halba are also professional weaver. Many became jobless when modern powerlooms methods came in 1970s. Then, many started selling their foods which have become quite famous in Nagpur city. Their traditional food is known as Saoji which includes Sundari, Tari Pohe, Wada Bhat, Pithla Bhakar, Jhunka Bhakar, Sabudanawada, Saoji Chicken, Patwadi Rassa, Khur Saoji, Mutton Saoji, and Kothmirwadi.

Religion
The patron deity of Halba is Mata Mai. The Danteshwari Temple was established by Chalukya king in 14th century in Bastar district. They also worship other deities including Maili mata, Gusain-Pusain, Budhadeo, Kunwardeo.

References

Indian castes
Ethnic groups in India
Social groups of Maharashtra
Tribal communities of Maharashtra
Social groups of Madhya Pradesh
Scheduled Tribes of India
Ethnic groups in Chhattisgarh